Belvedere (from Italian, meaning "beautiful sight") may refer to:

Places

Australia 
Belvedere, Queensland, a locality in the Cassowary Coast Region

Africa
Belvedere (Casablanca), a neighborhood in Casablanca, Morocco
Belvedere, Harare, Zimbabwe, a suburb

Europe 
 Belvédère, Alpes-Maritimes, France, a commune
 Belvedere Giacomo Puccini, Torre del Lago Puccini (LU), Toscana. This belvedere consists of a small plaza on Lago Massaciuccoli, in front of the villa of composer Giacomo Puccini and bordering the grounds of the annual Puccini Opera Festival.
 Mount Belvedere, northern Italy
 Belvedere, London, United Kingdom, a suburban area and electoral ward, part of the borough of Bexley
 Belvedere Glacier, in the Italian Alps
 Belvedere, Suvereto, Tuscany, Italy
 Belvedur, Slovenia

North America 
 Belvedere, California, a city
 Belvedere Lagoon, an artificial lagoon
 Belvedere Park, California
 Belvedere, a neighborhood, now part of East Los Angeles, California
 Belvedere Island, Marin County, California
 Belvedere, Delaware, an unincorporated community
 Belvedere, Michigan, ghost town
 Belvedere, Ohio, a populated place
 Belvedere, South Carolina, a census-designated place
 Riverfront Plaza/Belvedere, a public area in Louisville, Kentucky
 Belvedere, United States Virgin Islands, a settlement
 Belvedere, Alberta, Canada, a locality
 Belvedere, Edmonton, Alberta, Canada, a neighborhood

South America 
 Belvedere, Montevideo, Uruguay, a neighborhood

Buildings 
 Belvedere (structure), in architecture, a structure designed to incorporate a view
 Belvedere, Vienna, Austria, a palace complex
 Belvedere (Palace Chapel)
 Hotel Belvédère du Rayon Vert, Art Deco building at Cerbère, France
 Belvedere auf dem Pfingstberg, a palace in Potsdam, Germany
 Belvedere auf dem Klausberg, a building in Potsdam, Germany
 Schloss Belvedere, Weimar, Germany, a small palace
 Belvedere Castle, a folly in Central Park in Manhattan, New York City
 Belvédère Castle, Laeken, Belgium
 Queen Anne's Summer Palace, Prague, Czech Republic
 Cortile del Belvedere or Belvedere Courtyard, Vatican Palace, Rome
 Belvedere Estate, Calcutta, which houses the National Library of India
 Belvedere Garden, a private housing estate in Tsuen Wan, Hong Kong
 Belvedere House and Gardens, Ireland
 Fort Belvedere (disambiguation)
 Belvedere Hotel, Baltimore, Maryland, United States
 Belvedere (West Virginia), United States, a mansion in the National Register of Historic Places
 Estadio Belvedere, a multi-use stadium in Montevideo, Uruguay
 Belvédère tower, an observation tower near Mulhouse, Alsace, France
 Belvedere Water Tower, Aachen, Germany
 Belvedere Apartments (Columbia, Missouri), a residential complex in Columbia, Missouri, United States
 Villa St Ignatius (originally called Bel-Vedere), St. Julian's, Malta
 Belevedere, earlier name of Pontikokastro, a castle in southern Greece
 Belvedere, Belvederio dvaras, Lithuania
 Belweder, a former presidential palace in Poland

Schools
 Belvedere College, Dublin, Ireland, a private Jesuit secondary school for boys
 The Belvedere Academy, a girls' school in Liverpool, England

Football clubs
 Belvedere F.C., an Irish association football club
 Burnley Belvedere F.C., an English association football club

Transportation
  – an East Indiaman of the British East India Company
 Bristol Belvedere, a British military helicopter designed by the Bristol Aeroplane Company
 Plymouth Belvedere, an American automobile made by Plymouth from 1951 through 1970
 Belvedere railway station, London, United Kingdom
 Belvedere LRT Station, in Edmonton, Alberta, Canada

Arts and entertainment
 Belvedere (M. C. Escher), a 1958 lithograph by M. C. Escher
 The Belvedere, a 1913 work by English painter John William Godward
 Belvedere (band), a Canadian punk rock band founded in the late 1990s
 Belvedere (comic strip), running from 1962
 Belvedere (film), a 2010 film
 Lynn Aloysius Belvedere, the main character of the 1947 novel Belvedere by Gwen Davenport, three films, and the television series Mr. Belvedere
 Belvedere, a variation of the Bristol card game
 Österreichische Galerie Belvedere, Vienna, Austria, an art museum housed in Belvedere Castle

Business
 Belvédère (company), an alcohol-related company based in Beaune, France
 Belvedere Records, an American record label
 Belvedere Vodka, a brand of Polish vodka

People
 Andrea Belvedere (1646–?), Italian Baroque painter
 Robert Mascara (born 1972), floor manager on the show Good Morning Australia, nicknamed "Belvedere"

Other uses
 Earl of Belvedere, an Irish peerage from 1756 to 1814

See also
 Miss Belvedere, a Plymouth Belvedere automobile sealed in an underground vault as a 50-year time-capsule in 1957
 Erith & Belvedere F.C., an English association football club
 Old Belvedere, an Irish rugby union club
 Belvidere (disambiguation)
 Belvedér, a viewing point in the Czech Republic
 Belweder, a palace in Warsaw, a former residence of several Polish presidents
 Bellevedere, Flacq, a village in Flacq District, Mauritius